Persatuan Sepakbola Indonesia Kudus (simply known as Persiku Kudus) is an Indonesian football club based in Kudus, Central Java. They currently compete in the Liga 3. Their best achievement was when in 2005 Liga Indonesia Second Division, they managed to become champions in a 2–1 victory over Perserang Serang at the Wergu Wetan Stadium. and one of the Persiku's player, Agus Santiko is also entitled to the title of top scorer by scoring 16 goals.

Nickname
 Macan Muria (Indonesian: The Muria Tiger)
 Laskar Telingsing (Indonesian: Telingsing Warriors) = telingsing is founder of the Kudus city, so Laskar telingsing made in the nickname of the Persiku Kudus.

Players

Current squad

Coaching Staff

Honours
Liga Indonesia Second Division / Liga 3
 Winner (1): 2005
 Fourth place: 2016Liga 3 Central Java Winner (1): 2019
Trofeo Fahrida Inayati
Winner (1): 2021

References

External links
 

 
Football clubs in Indonesia
Sport in Central Java
Association football clubs established in 1955
1955 establishments in Indonesia
Football clubs in Central Java